Stromatitica is a genus of moth in the family Cosmopterigidae. It contains only one species, Stromatitica chrysanthes, which is found on the Solomon Islands.

References

External links
Natural History Museum Lepidoptera genus database

Cosmopterigidae